John A. Curry (born May 12, 1934) was the President of Northeastern University from 1989 to 1996. Prior to serving as president, Curry was the University's Executive Vice President. Curry is the first alumnus to serve as Northeastern's president.

Curry grew up in the city of Lynn, Massachusetts and graduated from Lynn English High School where he is a member of the Lynn English sport's hall of fame.

After receiving both his bachelor's and master's degree from Northeastern University, Curry went on to earn his Doctor of Education from Boston University.  Curry is the husband of Marcia Curry, with whom he has three children; Robert Curry, Timothy Curry, and Susan Brown.  The "John and Marcia Curry Student Center" was dedicated to President Curry following his retirement from Northeastern University.

During Curry's tenure, Northeastern University built a new science and engineering research center, a state-of-the-art classroom building, a recreation complex, and added new undergraduate and graduate programs. Curry also restructured the University and established a computer network on campus. In 1993, Curry hosted President Bill Clinton.

Since his retirement, Curry has published nine books.  His first novel is titled "Loyalty" and his most recent novel "Running in Lane One" was published in 2009. Curry currently resides in Saugus, Massachusetts.

References

People from Saugus, Massachusetts
Northeastern University alumni
1934 births
Living people
Boston University School of Education alumni
People from Lynn, Massachusetts
American chief executives
Presidents of Northeastern University